Simonoonops is a genus of spiders in the family Oonopidae. It was first described in 2002 by Harvey. , it contains 11 species.

Species
Simonoonops comprises the following species:
Simonoonops andersoni Platnick & Dupérré, 2011
Simonoonops chickeringi Platnick & Dupérré, 2011
Simonoonops craneae (Chickering, 1968)
Simonoonops etang Platnick & Dupérré, 2011
Simonoonops globina (Chickering, 1968)
Simonoonops grande Platnick & Dupérré, 2011
Simonoonops lutzi Platnick & Dupérré, 2011
Simonoonops princeps (Simon, 1892)
Simonoonops simoni Platnick & Dupérré, 2011
Simonoonops soltina (Chickering, 1968)
Simonoonops spiniger Simon, 1892

References

Oonopidae
Araneomorphae genera
Spiders of South America
Invertebrates of Venezuela
Spiders of the Caribbean